Interruption may refer to:
Interruption (speech), refers to a speech event when one person breaks in to interject while another person is talking
Interruption science, interruption and human behavior
Interruption marketing, a pejorative term for the advertising technique
Interruptions (epic theatre), the technique defined by Bertolt Brecht
Interrupted projection

See also
 
 Interrupt, for the usage related to computing